Ordinary Silence is an album by Ohio-based pop punk band Mixtapes.

Background
The second full-length album released by Mixtapes, the album was released in just under a year after their debut full-length album Even on the Worst Nights. Originally intending to release an EP before the 2014 Warped Tour, the band found themselves with enough songs to make a full-length album.

Track listing

Personnel
Ryan Rockwell – vocals, guitar, bass guitar
Maura Weaver – vocals, guitar
Boone Haley – drums

References

2013 albums
No Sleep Records albums